Xenobiotica is a peer-reviewed medical journal that publishes comprehensive research papers on all areas of xenobiotics. It is published by Informa plc and covers six main areas:

 General xenobiochemistry, including in vitro studies concerned with the metabolism, disposition and excretion of drugs, and other xenobiotics, as well as the structure, function and regulation of associated enzymes
 Clinical pharmacokinetics and metabolism, covering the pharmacokinetics and absorption, distribution, metabolism and excretion of drugs and other xenobiotics in man.
 Animal pharmacokinetics and metabolism, covering the pharmacokinetics, and absorption, distribution, metabolism and excretion of drugs and other xenobiotics in animals.
 Pharmacogenetics, defined as the identification and functional characterisation of polymorphic genes that encode xenobiotic metabolising enzymes and transporters that may result in altered enzymatic, cellular and clinical responses to xenobiotics.
 Molecular toxicology, concerning the mechanisms of toxicity and the study of toxicology of xenobiotics at the molecular level.
 Topics in xenobiochemistry, in the form of reviews and commentaries are primarily intended to be a critical analysis of the issue, wherein the author offers opinions on the relevance of data or of a particular experimental approach or methodology.

According to the Journal Citation Reports, the journal received a 2014 impact factor of 2.199, ranking it 134th out of 254 journals in the category Pharmacology & Pharmacy and 50th out of 87 journals in the category Toxicology.

The editor in chief is Costas Ioannides (University of Surrey).

Abstracting and indexing 
Xenobiotica is abstracted and indexed in Biochemistry and Biophysics Citation Index, BIOSIS, Chemical Abstracts; Current Contents/Life Science, EBSCO, Science Citation Index, PASCAL, SciSearch, Scopus, and Index Medicus/MEDLINE/PubMed.

References

External links 
 

Publications established in 1971
Pharmacology journals
Toxicology journals
Taylor & Francis academic journals
Monthly journals
English-language journals